Jessica Lawson is an author of middle-grade books.

Biography
Lawson attended Homestead High School in Indiana, going on to earn a BA in Spanish from the University of Denver and a MS in Outdoor Recreation and Natural Resource Management from Indiana University. She has lived in Colorado and Pennsylvania.

She began writing in mid-2009 after the birth of her first child. Lawson produced eight manuscripts before selling The Actual & Truthful Adventures of Becky Thatcher.

Accolades
Publishers Weekly praised The Actual & Truthful Adventures of Becky Thatcher, as "a rewarding read" and "a delightfully clever debut" in a starred review. Bank Street College named Nooks & Crannies to its Best Children's Books of 2016 list.

Selected works

References

External links
 
 

Year of birth missing (living people)
Living people
American children's writers
University of Denver alumni
Indiana University alumni